Babu is a district of the city of Hezhou, Guangxi, China.

County-level divisions of Guangxi
Administrative divisions of Hezhou